Trichobilharzia is a genus of trematodes in the family Schistosomatidae. They are worldwide distributed parasites of anatid birds and causative agents of human cercarial dermatitis.

Species
Trichobilharzia ocellata (La Valette, 1855)
Trichobilharzia regenti Horák, Kolářová & Dvořák, 1998
 Trichobilharzia franki Müller & Kimmig, 1994

References

Diplostomida
Digenea genera